Lu Wei (born 10 December 2005) is a Chinese diver.

She participated at the 2019 World Aquatics Championships, winning a medal.

References

2005 births
Living people
Chinese female divers
World Aquatics Championships medalists in diving
21st-century Chinese women